Dwight David Eisenhower II (born March 31, 1948) is an American author, public policy fellow, professor at the University of Pennsylvania, and eponym of the U.S. presidential retreat Camp David. He is the grandson of President Dwight D. Eisenhower and First Lady Mamie Eisenhower, and a son-in-law of President Richard Nixon and First Lady Pat Nixon.

Early life

Dwight David Eisenhower II, better known as David, was named after his grandfather, Ike. David was born on March 31, 1948, in West Point, New York, to Barbara (Thompson) and John Eisenhower, the only son and eldest of four children. His father was a U.S. Army officer, and his grandfather was Dwight D. Eisenhower, future president of the United States, and former Supreme Allied Commander of the Allied Expeditionary Forces in Europe during World War II.

His father would go on to be a brigadier general in the U.S. Army Reserve, United States Ambassador to Belgium (1969–1971), and a renowned military historian.  His grandfather would become president of Columbia University (1948–1953), and later the 34th president of the United States (1953–1961). After assuming the presidency in 1953, President Eisenhower renamed the presidential mountain retreat, formerly Camp Shangri-La, Camp David, after his grandson.

Early life and education
Eisenhower graduated from Phillips Exeter Academy in 1966. He received his Bachelor of Arts degree in history cum laude from Amherst College in 1970. After college, he served for three years as an officer in the United States Naval Reserve. He then earned his J.D. degree cum laude from The George Washington University Law School in 1976.

He was at least loosely identified with the Nixon administration, when he accepted a request to attend the funeral of Dan Mitrione in 1970, the operative whose activities in training Uruguayan police in torture techniques, when later publicized, caused profound controversy, although there has been no suggestion that Eisenhower had any knowledge of Mitrione's controversial activities.

He is today a teaching adjunct and public policy fellow at the Annenberg School for Communication at the University of Pennsylvania, author, and co-chair of the Foreign Policy Research Institute's History Institute for Teachers. From 2001 to 2003, he was editor of  Orbis, a quarterly published by the institute.

Eisenhower was a finalist for the Pulitzer Prize in history in 1987 for his work Eisenhower At War, 1943-1945 about the Allied leadership during World War II.

He is the host of a public television series called The Whole Truth with David Eisenhower, distributed by American Public Television.

Personal life

On December 22, 1968, Eisenhower married Julie Nixon, a daughter of then President-elect Nixon, who had served as Dwight Eisenhower's vice president. The couple had known each other since meeting at the 1956 Republican National Convention. The Reverend Norman Vincent Peale officiated in the non-denominational rite at the Marble Collegiate Church in New York City. Eisenhower's best man was future The Love Boat actor and U.S. congressman Fred Grandy.

David Eisenhower was Julie Nixon's civilian escort when she was presented as a debutante to high society at the prestigious International Debutante Ball at the Waldorf-Astoria Hotel in New York City in 1966. Many other members of the Eisenhower and Nixon families have been presented as debutantes at the International Debutante Ball, including their daughter Jennie.

Eisenhower and his wife Julie live in Berwyn, Pennsylvania. They have three children: actress Jennie Elizabeth Eisenhower (b. 1978); Alexander Richard Eisenhower (b. 1980); and Melanie Catherine Eisenhower (b. 1984). They also have three grandchildren.

In popular culture 
Due to his connection with Julie and President Nixon, Eisenhower was one inspiration for the Creedence Clearwater Revival song "Fortunate Son", released in 1969. The song's author and singer, John Fogerty, wrote:

In the satirical 1976 film Tunnel Vision, Eisenhower is identified as President of the United States in the then-future year of 1985, succeeding an African-American woman named Washington, who in turn took over from George Wallace.

References

Further reading

External links

1948 births
Living people
Amherst College alumni
American male writers
American people of Swiss-German descent
Eisenhower family
Foreign Policy Research Institute
George Washington University Law School alumni
Nixon family
People from Chester County, Pennsylvania
People from West Point, New York
Phillips Exeter Academy alumni
United States Navy officers
Writers from Pennsylvania
Military personnel from New York (state)
Military personnel from Pennsylvania
Pennsylvania Republicans
University of Pennsylvania faculty